2010 UEFA U-19 Championship (qualifying round) was the first round of qualifications for the final tournament of 2010 UEFA European Under-19 Championship. The final tournament of the 2010 UEFA European Under-19 Championship is preceded by two qualification stages: a qualifying round and an Elite round. During these rounds, 52 national teams competed to determine the seven teams that will join the already qualified host nation France.

The first qualifying round was played between 1 September and 30 November 2009. The 52 teams were divided into 13 groups of four teams, with each group being contested as a mini-tournament, hosted by one of the group's teams. After all matches have been played, the 13 group winners and 13 group runners-up advanced to the Elite round. Alongside the 26 winner and runner-up teams, the two best third-placed teams also qualified.

First qualification round groups

Group 1

Group 2

Group 3

Group 4

Group 5

Group 6

Group 7

Group 8

Group 9

Group 10

Group 11

Group 12

Group 13

Third-placed qualifiers
At the end of the first stage, a comparison was made between the third-placed teams from all groups. The two best third-placed teams advanced to the next round, with only the results against the top two teams from each group used for classifying the teams.

Elite round

The Elite round was set to be played before the end of May 2010. The 28 teams advancing from the qualifying round were distributed into seven groups of four teams, with each group being contested in the same format as in the qualifying round. The seven group-winning teams will qualify for the final tournament in France.

Each team was allocated to one of four drawing pots, according to their qualifying round results. The seven sides with the best record were present in Pot A, and so forth until Pot D, which contained the seven teams with the weakest record. During the draw, each group was filled with one team from every pot, meaning that no team from the same pot could be drawn together. In the same way, teams who played each other in the qualifying round could not be drawn together.

See also
2010 UEFA European Under-19 Championship

External links
Qualifying round

Qualification
UEFA European Under-19 Championship qualification